The 1985–86 Cupa României was the 48th edition of Romania's most prestigious football cup competition.

The title was won by Dinamo București against Steaua București.

Format
The competition is an annual knockout tournament.

First round proper matches are played on the ground of the lowest ranked team, then from the second round proper the matches are played on a neutral location.

If a match is drawn after 90 minutes, the game goes in extra time, if the scored is still tight after 120 minutes, then the winner will be established at penalty kicks.

From the first edition, the teams from Divizia A entered in competition in sixteen finals, rule which remained till today.

First round proper

|colspan=3 style="background-color:#FFCCCC;"|4 December 1985

Second round proper

|colspan=3 style="background-color:#FFCCCC;"|22 February 1986

|-
|colspan=3 style="background-color:#FFCCCC;"|26 February 1986

Quarter-finals

|colspan=3 style="background-color:#FFCCCC;"|14 May 1986

|-
|colspan=3 style="background-color:#FFCCCC;"|15 May 1986

Semi-finals

|colspan=3 style="background-color:#FFCCCC;"|21 June 1986

Final

References

External links
 romaniansoccer.ro
 Official site
 The Romanian Cup on the FRF's official site

Cupa României seasons
Cupa României
Romania